Abbasabad-e Kani Kabud (also Romanized as ‘Abbāsābād-e Kānī Kābūd and ‘Abbāsābād-e Kon Kābūd) is a village in Mirbag-e Shomali Rural District, in the Central District of Delfan County, Lorestan Province, Iran. At the 2006 census, its population was 53, in 10 families.

References 

Towns and villages in Delfan County